Lieutenant General Rana Pratap Kalita, PVSM, UYSM, AVSM, SM, VSM is a serving general officer in the Indian Army. He is currently the General Officer Commanding-in-Chief (GOC-in-C) of the Indian Army's Eastern Command. He previously commanded the III Corps at Dimapur.

Personal life
Kalita was born in a Assamese Kalita family, in Rangia of Kamrup District to Jogendra Kalita & Renu Kalita. He is an alumnus of Sainik School, Goalpara and National Defence Academy Khadakwasla.

Military career
General Kalita was commissioned in 9 Kumaon Regiment on 9 June 1984 from Indian Military Academy Dehradun. He had commanded III Corps  and was the Chief of Staff of Eastern Command. He served as Director General - Manpower Planning and Personnel Services at Army Headquarters. General Kalita is a recepeint of UYSM, AVSM, SM and VSM.

He became the first Assamese to hold the charge of General Officer-Commanding-in-Chief of the Eastern Command. He succeeded Lieutenant General Manoj Pande on his elevation to Vice Chief of the Army Staff.

Awards and decorations

Dates of rank

References 

Indian generals
Living people
Indian Army officers
National Defence Academy (India) alumni
Indian military personnel
Assamese people
Year of birth missing (living people)
Recipients of the Param Vishisht Seva Medal
Recipients of the Uttam Yudh Seva Medal
Recipients of the Ati Vishisht Seva Medal
Recipients of the Sena Medal
Recipients of the Vishisht Seva Medal